Allemans-du-Dropt (literally Allemans of the Dropt) is a commune of the Lot-et-Garonne department in southwestern France.

Population

Notable people
 

Raphaël Trémouilhe (1891–1978), politician

See also
Communes of the Lot-et-Garonne department

References

Communes of Lot-et-Garonne